Guira may refer to:

 Guira cuckoo (Guira guira)
 Guira tanager (Hemithraupis guira)
 Güira, musical instrument